Capitol Hill is a comedy-horror soap opera web series, which premiered on The Huffington Post website in 2014.  The series was created, written, directed and produced by Wes Hurley.  The show is named after Seattle's historic Capitol Hill neighborhood.

Both inspired by and parodying TV shows of the 1970s and 1980s such as Murder, She Wrote, Dallas, and Charlie's Angels, the series focuses on young and innocent Roses Smell (Waxie Moon) who escapes from Portland, and finds romance and stardom as a TV personality in Seattle.  Capitol Hill is both a dark comedy and a queer deconstruction of narrative cliches and traditional gender norms.  Other influences cited by Hurley include anime, Giallo and Twin Peaks.

Cast

Main
 Waxie Moon as Roses Smell
 Robbie Turner as Dottie Pearl
 BenDeLaCreme as herself
 Jinkx Monsoon as Celeste Dahl
 Alexandra Tavares as Tanya
 Jonathan Crimeni as Mayor
 Colby Keller as himself
 Mark Siano as George

Recurring
 Guinevere Turner as therapist
 Annette Toutonghi as Mother Terisha
 Charles Leggett as Holy Godfather
 Jason Carter as Father Dick
 Aleksa Manila as Helena Pen Poison
 Miss Indigo Blue as Poops Smell
 Zoe Scofield as Demon
 Sarah Rudinoff as Anna Zhopova
 Jennifer Jasper as Sister Malvina
 Jackie Hell as Dinky Pie

Season One

In the first season, Roses runs away from Portland, which in the show is portrayed as a Deep South community populated by inbred cannibals and illiterate rednecks.  Upon her arrival in Seattle, Roses instantly makes a new best friend - Tanya (Alexandra Tavares) - who takes her in and finds her a job on a local TV news station.  When the resident queen bee Dottie Pearl (played by Robbie Turner) falls ill, Roses has an opportunity to host Pearl's news segment.  The TV station's sleazy owner, George Hall (Mark Siano), is so impressed with Roses' performance that he gives her a new talk show called "Women in the Workplace".  While hosting one of the episodes of "Women in the Workplace", Roses befriends the world's most popular and controversial nun, Mother Terisha.  Mother Terisha recruits Roses to go undercover to a gay bar to spy on gay activists who are ruining her reputation.  But instead of aiding Mother Terisha, Roses, disguised as a gay man, falls in love with a handsome bartender, Michelle.  After meeting Helena Pen Poison, the world's most famous forensic scientist and mystery writer, Roses agrees to help the investigation against Mother Terisha, with grave consequences.  Meanwhile, Dottie Pearl gets possessed by a demonic being who uses Dottie to get closer to Roses.  Each episode is introduced by BenDeLaCreme.

This season was presented as a series of 10 episodes.  Subsequently the series played at many film festivals including Geneva International Film Festival Tous Ecrans, Raindance, Seattle Lesbian & Gay Film Festival, Mix Brasil Festival and Oslo/Fusion.

The first season was nominated for Best Comedy Series, Best Makeup, Best Production Design, Best Cinematography and earned Harmony Arnold the Best Costumes award at the Indie Series Awards.  The first season was also nominated for Best Series at Geneva International Film Festival Tous Ecrans and Best Production Design at the Miami Webfest.

Season Two

Season 2 trailer starring Kenneth "Kenny" Brain of Big Brother, Waxie Moon and Baby Bear premiered in August 2015 on Out and WorldofWonder.com.  Season 2 premiered in October 2015 with Jinkx Monsoon, Colby Keller, Jason Carter, Jackie Hell, Sarah Rudinoff and Guinevere Turner joining the cast.

References

External links
 

2014 web series debuts
American LGBT-related web series
American comedy web series
Mystery web series
2010s American LGBT-related comedy television series